In Greek mythology, Aethra or Aithra (the "bright sky")  was a Troezenian princess as the daughter of King Pittheus.

Family 
Aithra was the mother of Theseus (his father was King Aegeus of Athens, or in some versions, Poseidon) and of Clymene (by Hippalces). Aethra was also called Pittheis after her father Pittheus.

Mythology

Early life 
Bellerophon came to Troezen to ask Aethra's father, Pittheus, for the maiden's hand in marriage, but the hero was banished from Corinth before the nuptials took place.

King Aegeus who was childless with his previous marriages went to Troezen, a city southwest of Athens that had as its patrons Athena and Poseidon. Here Pittheus got Aegeus drunk on unmixed wine and put him to bed with his daughter. Following the instructions of Athena in a dream, she left the sleeping Aegeus and waded across to the island of Sphairia that lay close to Troezen's shore. There she poured a libation to Sphairos, Pelops' charioteer, and laid with Poseidon in the night. Aethra was therefore impregnated by both Aegeus and Poseidon in the process.  According to Plutarch, her father spread this report merely that Theseus might be regarded as the son of Poseidon, who was much revered at Troezen.

Aethra, later on dedicated in the island of Sphairia a temple to Athena Apaturia (the Deceitful), and called the island Hiera instead of Sphaeria, and also introduced among the maidens of Troezen the custom of dedicating their girdles to Athena Apaturia on the day of their marriage. At a later time, when Aethra was thus doubly pregnant, Aegeus decided to go back to Athens. Before leaving, he covered his sandals, shield and sword under a huge rock, that served as a primitive altar to Strong Zeus, and told her that when their son would grow up, he should move the rock and bring his weapons back. Aethra did as she was told, and Theseus, recovering the weapons that were his birthright, grew to be a great hero, killing the Minotaur, among other adventures.

Later adventures 
Later, when Theseus kidnapped Helen, he gave her to Aethra for safekeeping. Helen's brothers, the Dioscuri, took Helen back and kidnapped Aethra to Lacedaemon in revenge. There she became a slave of Helen with whom she went to Troy and remained there until found by her grandson, Acamas. At the taking of Troy she came to the camp of the Greeks, where she was recognised by her grandsons, and Demophon, one of them, asked Agamemnon to procure her liberation. Agamemnon accordingly sent a messenger to Helen to request her to give up Aethra. This was granted, and Aethra became free again. According to Hyginus, she afterwards put an end to her own life from grief at the death of her sons. The history of her bondage to Helen was represented on the celebrated chest of Cypselus, and in a painting by Polygnotus in the Lesche of Delphi.

Gallery

In popular culture 
With significant alterations to the character, a version of this Aethra appears (as "Aithra"), a sorceress and concubine of Poseidon, in Richard Strauss's famous opera Die ägyptische Helena (The Egyptian Helen).

Notes

References 
 Apollodorus, The Library with an English Translation by Sir James George Frazer, F.B.A., F.R.S. in 2 Volumes, Cambridge, MA, Harvard University Press; London, William Heinemann Ltd. 1921. ISBN 0-674-99135-4. Online version at the Perseus Digital Library. Greek text available from the same website.
Bacchylides, Odes translated by Diane Arnson Svarlien. 1991. Online version at the Perseus Digital Library.
Bacchylides, The Poems and Fragments. Cambridge University Press. 1905. Greek text available at the Perseus Digital Library.
Bell, Robert E., Women of Classical Mythology: A Biographical Dictionary. ABC-Clio. 1991. .
Dictys Cretensis, from The Trojan War. The Chronicles of Dictys of Crete and Dares the Phrygian translated by Richard McIlwaine Frazer, Jr. (1931-). Indiana University Press. 1966. Online version at the Topos Text Project.
Gaius Julius Hyginus, Fabulae from The Myths of Hyginus translated and edited by Mary Grant. University of Kansas Publications in Humanistic Studies. Online version at the Topos Text Project.
Graves, Robert, The Greek Myths, Harmondsworth, London, England, Penguin Books, 1960. 
Lucius Mestrius Plutarchus, Lives with an English Translation by Bernadotte Perrin. Cambridge, MA. Harvard University Press. London. William Heinemann Ltd. 1914. 1. Online version at the Perseus Digital Library. Greek text available from the same website.
Pausanias, Description of Greece with an English Translation by W.H.S. Jones, Litt.D., and H.A. Ormerod, M.A., in 4 Volumes. Cambridge, MA, Harvard University Press; London, William Heinemann Ltd. 1918. . Online version at the Perseus Digital Library
Pausanias, Graeciae Descriptio. 3 vols. Leipzig, Teubner. 1903.  Greek text available at the Perseus Digital Library.
Publius Ovidius Naso, The Epistles of Ovid. London. J. Nunn, Great-Queen-Street; R. Priestly, 143, High-Holborn; R. Lea, Greek-Street, Soho; and J. Rodwell, New-Bond-Street. 1813. Online version at the Perseus Digital Library.
William Smith. A Dictionary of Greek and Roman biography and mythology. s.v. Aethra. London (1848).
Mythological rape victims
Women of Poseidon
Princesses in Greek mythology
Theseus
Laconian mythology
Troezenian mythology
Suicides in Greek mythology